Nazim Suleymanov (born 17 February 1965) is a Soviet and Azerbaijani football coach and a former player best known as a striker for Alania Vladikavkaz in the 1990s. He is the manager of the Russian club FC Khimki-M.

Suleymanov was the first player ever to score for Azerbaijan in international football, in a friendly against Georgia in 1992. Despite a second goal from Suleymanov and one from Vidadi Rzayev, they lost 6-3.

International goals

Honours

Club
 Alania Vladikavkaz
Russian Premier League (1): 1995
Russian Premier League Runners-up (2): 1992, 1996

Personal
Most overall goals scored for Alania Vladikavkaz: 60
Best 33 players of the Russia Top League season: No. 3 - 1992, 1993

References

External links
Biography of the Player

1965 births
Living people
Azerbaijani footballers
Azerbaijani expatriate footballers
Expatriate footballers in Russia
FC Spartak Vladikavkaz players
FC Zhemchuzhina Sochi players
Soviet Top League players
Russian Premier League players
Soviet footballers
Azerbaijani football managers
Azerbaijani expatriate football managers
FC Zhemchuzhina Sochi managers
Expatriate football managers in Russia
Khazar Lankaran FK managers
People from Sumgait
Soviet Azerbaijani people
FC Spartak Moscow players
Association football forwards
Azerbaijan international footballers
Neftçi PFK players
Sumgayit FK managers